Charles Smith (2 July 1905 – 17 September 1967) was a South African cricketer. He played in one first-class match for Border in 1929/30.

See also
 List of Border representative cricketers

References

External links
 

1905 births
1967 deaths
South African cricketers
Border cricketers